Heliothis sturmhoefeli is a species of moth of the family Noctuidae. It is found in South America, including Brazil.

External links
Noctuídeos (Lepidoptera, Noctuidae) Do Museu Entomológico Ceslau Biezanko, Departamento De Fitossanidade, Faculdade De Agronomia “Eliseu Maciel”, Universidade Federal De Pelotas, RS 

Heliothis
Moths described in 1927